Styla is a village in Starobesheve Raion (district) in Donetsk Oblast of eastern Ukraine, at 46.9 km south from the centre of Donetsk city.

Pro-Russian forces took the village under their control during the Russo-Ukrainian War.

Demographics
Native language as of the Ukrainian Census of 2001:
Ukrainian 3.23%
Russian 87.49%
Greek 8.96%
Belorussian 0.23%
Moldavian 0.05%

References

External links

Media Coverage of the War in Donbas
 Styla, search results on string "Styla" in Information Resistance.

Villages in Kalmiuske Raion